Éwanjé-Épée is a French language surname. Notable people with the surname include:

Maryse Éwanjé-Épée (born 1964), French high jumper
Monique Éwanjé-Épée (born 1967), French hurdler

Compound surnames
French-language surnames